BR serine/threonine-protein kinase 2 is an enzyme that in humans is encoded by the BRSK2 gene.

References

Further reading

External links
 

EC 2.7.11